Elbow is an unincorporated community in Howard County, Texas, United States.

Geography 
Elbow is located at 32°9’37” North, 101°30’43” West (32.1604012, -101.5120686).

Education
Elbow is served by the Forsan Independent School District.

References

External links
History:  The History of Forsan  Elbow is mentioned in Joyce Baggett's research paper.
Forsan Independent School District Click on the "Elementary Campus" link for Elbow Elementary.

Unincorporated communities in Howard County, Texas
Unincorporated communities in Texas